Southeastern Oklahoma State University (Southeastern, SE, or SOSU) is a public university in Durant, Oklahoma. It had an undergraduate enrollment of 4,824 in 2019.

History

On March 6, 1909, the Second Oklahoma State Legislature approved an act designating Durant as the location for a normal school to serve the following 12-county region: Atoka, Bryan, Carter, Choctaw, Latimer, LeFlore, Love, Marshall, McCurtain, McIntosh, Pittsburg, and Pushmataha. Southeastern Oklahoma State University first opened its doors to students on June 14, 1909, as Southeastern State Normal School. The early program of instruction consisted of four years of high school and the freshman and sophomore college years. The first sessions of the school were held in temporary quarters pending completion of Morrison Hall in January, 1911, long known as the Administration Building.

The original purpose of Southeastern was the education of teachers for the public schools of Oklahoma. The two-year graduates were awarded life teaching certificates. In 1921, the institution became a four-year college and was renamed Southeastern State Teachers College. Construction on the college's library, now the Henry G. Bennett Memorial Library, was completed in 1928. The primary function remained that of teacher education and the degrees of Bachelor of Arts in Education and Bachelor of Science in Education were authorized.

The purpose of the college was expanded in 1939. Courses leading to two newly authorized non-education degrees - Bachelor of Arts and Bachelor of Science - were added. At this time, the college was renamed Southeastern State College. In 1954, the curriculum was enlarged by the addition of a graduate program leading to the Master of Teaching degree. In 1969, the name of the degree was changed to Master of Education.

On May 27, 1968, the Oklahoma State Regents for Higher Education designated Southeastern as an Area Community College. While retaining previous functions, the college moved in the direction of providing greater post-secondary educational opportunities by expanding its curriculum to include new programs in areas such as business, technology, aviation, and conservation.

In 1971, the Oklahoma State Regents for Higher Education requested that the state supported institutions of higher education review and evaluate their functions as members of the State System of Higher Education. Upon completion of the review, a comprehensive “Plan for the Seventies” was prepared by each institution and submitted to the Regents. On June 1, 1972, Southeastern submitted its plan to the Regents which was, subsequently, approved on March 29, 1973. The Master of Education degree was changed to the Master of Behavioral Studies and, subsequently, the university was approved to offer a graduate program in business which culminated in the degree of Master of Administrative Studies. Four options of the Master of Behavioral Studies degree were renamed Master of Education in August, 1979. The Master of Administrative Studies degree was revised and renamed Master of Business Administration in August, 1996.

On August 15, 1974, the name of Southeastern State College was changed to Southeastern Oklahoma State University by an act of the Oklahoma State Legislature. Since 1974, Southeastern, through institutional reorganizations, has continued to diversify, so that, presently, there are three academic schools: Arts and Sciences, Business, and Education and Behavioral Science.

Southeastern has a zero tolerance policy regarding student conduct. Punishments occur for violations of campus regulations including punishments of alleged violations which cannot be appealed, as per the guidelines set by the Regional University System of Oklahoma. Controversy occurred after football player Justin Pitrucha was suspended following felony charges of possession of marijuana with intent to distribute within 2,000 feet of a school. However, instead of upholding the policy, Pitrucha was fully reinstated after the charge was later reduced to a misdemeanor.

After the 20-year tenure of President Leon Hibbs, Dr. Larry Williams served ten years as Southeastern's president. Dr. Glen D. Johnson served Southeastern for 9 years then in 2007 assumed the duties of Chancellor of the Oklahoma State System for Higher Education. Dr. Jesse Snowden succeeded Johnson as interim president. Dr. Michael Turner was selected as SE president in 2008 and inaugurated in January 2009. He announced his resignation June 2009, and Regents named Dr. Larry Minks as interim then permanent president. Minks served as president through June 30, 2014, and Sean Burrage began duties as the 20th president on July 1, 2014.

Presidents

 Marcus E. Moore, 1909–1911
 Edmund Dandridge Murdaugh, 1911–1914
 William C. Canterbury, 1914–1915
 Andrew S. Faulkner, 1915–1916
 T. D. Brooks, 1916–1919
 Henry Garland Bennett, 1919–1928
 Eugene S. Briggs, 1928–1933
 Wade H. Schumate, 1933–1935
 Kate Galt Zaneis, May 1935 to July 1937.
 W. B. Morrison, Summer 1937
 H. Vance Posey, 1937–1939
 T. T. Montgomery, 1939–1952
 Alan E. Shearer, 1952–1967
 Elvin Leon Hibbs 1969 to April 1987
 Larry Williams, May 1987 to June 1997
 Glen D. Johnson, Jr., July 1997 to December 2006
 Jesse Snowden (Interim) 2007
 Michael Turner, January 2008 to June 2009
 Larry Minks, 2009–2014
 Sean Burrage, 2014– October 11, 2019
 Interim President Bryon Clark October 12, 2019 – April 2020
 Thomas W. Newsom April 2020 – Present

2011 gender discrimination lawsuit 
In April 2011, Dr. Rachel Tudor, an assistant professor of English, Humanities and Literature was denied tenure despite having been recommended for promotion and tenure twice in the prior two years by the Faculty Tenure and Promotion Committee, based on the university's criteria of teaching, scholarship and service. The committee, whose positive recommendations for tenure were routinely approved by the Administration, was overruled by Vice President of Academic Affairs Dr. Douglas McMillan, who had previously inquired of the university's Human Resources Department whether Dr. Tudor could be terminated because her lifestyle "offends his Baptist beliefs." Justifying the denial of tenure, McMillan has claimed that Tudor was unqualified, despite the original Tenure and Promotion Committee's findings, those of the Faculty Appeals Committee, and a resolution by the Faculty Senate in support of Tudor's application. Dr. Tudor, who had not worked at SE since May 2011, brought her case to the Oklahoma Human Rights Commission, the U.S. Department of Education, and the EEOC. On September 5, 2012, the EEOC issued a "Determination" that states Southeastern Oklahoma State University terminated Dr. Tudor's employment in violation of Title VII of the Civil Rights Act of 1964, as amended. The EEOC specifically cited sex discrimination, religious discrimination, and retaliation. Although Dr. Tudor welcomed the EEOC's conciliation offers, Southeastern rejected the EEOC's efforts, and the EEOC forwarded the case to the Department of Justice for consideration. On March 30, 2015, the Department of Justice filed a lawsuit against the university. The EEOC settled its suit with the university in August 2017. On November 20, 2017, a jury rendered a verdict of $1.165 million in favor of Dr. Tudor, finding that the university denied her tenure and the opportunity to reapply for tenure because of her gender, although it did not find the university created a hostile work environment.

2013 NAACP protests 
SE generated media attention in 2013 when the NAACP and Reverends Marshall Hatch and Ira Acree of the National Action Network spoke on behalf of five African-American college football students attending Southeastern, one of whom was from Chicago, regarding an incident which occurred on April 2, 2013. According to Durant Police, several people reported that masked men came to their residences and demanded money and cell phones. The students were suspended and scholarships revoked. All five were charged in June 2013 with felony conspiracy to engage in a pattern of criminal offenses plus misdemeanor charges of wearing a mask, hood or covering for the purposes of coercion, intimidation or harassment, and four counts of assault and battery.

During a preliminary hearing on October 16, 2013, all five men entered no-contest pleas to misdemeanor charges. The felony charges against them were dismissed as part of a plea agreement, and each was given three-year deferred sentences on the misdemeanor charges and also sentenced to 90 days in jail. Arlene Barnum of the NAACP contested their suspensions from SE under grounds of denial of the right to an attorney during disciplinary proceedings. Five members of the NAACP protested on the SE campus in May 2013 outside graduation ceremonies.

Academics
Southeastern offers associate, bachelor's, and master's degrees. Southeastern offers over 60 undergraduate degree plans. The school also offers 15 different graduate programs, with options for all face to face classes, all online classes, or a mix of the two. The top five most popular majors for new students in the Fall of 2018 in order were Biology, Aviation, Occupational Safety and Health, Elementary Education, and General Business. The Safety department at Southeastern is ranked four out of five stars in a national ranking. The Aviation program is also one of 88 colleges, nationwide, that received a Letter of Authorization from the FAA saying that Southeastern Aviation students had to complete 1000 hours instead of 1500 hours for cheaper educational experiences. The award enables Southeastern aviation majors to take less hours thus spend less money on tuition; also, this authorization shows that the SE aviation program is able to teach the needed material in less time than most schools. 
Southeastern Oklahoma State University offers educations to students from 32 states and 40 countries outside of the U.S.

Graduate programs
Graduate programs are offered at Southeastern Oklahoma State University through the School of Education, School of Arts and Sciences, and the School of Business. In studies conducted in 2014, the Southeastern School of Education had 85 students, the School of Arts and Sciences had 79 students, the School of Business had thirty-five, the Department of Aviation Sciences had 69, and the Department of Behavioral Sciences had 36. The Music Department has recently inaugurated a Master of Music Education degree, with the first graduates expected in May 2017.

Class size
The number of students enrolled as of fall 2018 is 4,483 students. Each year, approximately 1,100 people apply to the university and about 860 are accepted; out of the accepted, in 2013, eighteen percent were in the top ten percent of their high school class, forty-one percent were in the top twenty-five percent, and seventy-three percent were in the top fifty percent. The student to faculty ratio is 19:1. In Fall 2018, the university welcomed its biggest freshman class in six years, with a total enrollment of 600 students.

Additional facilities
SE has additional teaching facilities in the following location:
 McCurtain County branch campus (Idabel)
 University Center of Southern Oklahoma (Ardmore)
 Eastern Oklahoma State College (McAlester)
 Tinker Air Force Base and Rose State College (Midwest City)
 Grayson College (Denison and Van Alstyne, Texas)

Campus services

SE's campus services include: Student Support Services, Student Health Services, Academic Advising and Outreach Center, Learning Center, Wellness Center, Native American Institute, and Counseling Center.

Campus safety

This university's Campus Police Department operates 24/7 on campus along with emergency call boxes in various locations on campus, emergency alters such as disaster or weather, and its own phone line for direct calls to protect the students of the university. Southeastern received a B-minus safety rating in the American School Search College Factual 2014.

Organizations
The student body at Southeastern Oklahoma State University has the opportunity to become a part of over 90 student organizations active on campus.

Greek life 
Southeastern currently has two fraternities and two sororities on campus.

Fraternities: Sigma Tau Gamma and Tau Kappa Epsilon

Sororities: Alpha Sigma Tau and Sigma Sigma Sigma

Southeastern also has honorary fraternities on campus. Kappa Kappa Psi, Alpha Eta Rho, Alpha Psi Omega, Beta Alpha Psi, Phi Alpha Theta, and Sigma Tau Delta.

Athletics

SE is currently a member of the NCAA Division II Great American Conference. The Savage Storm participate in baseball, men's and women's basketball, football, men's and women's tennis, men's golf, rodeo, women's cross country, softball, cheerleading and women's volleyball.

Notable alumni
 Gary Batton, Chief of the Choctaw Nation of Oklahoma
 Tim Billings, college football coach
 Stanley Blair, former CFL player
 Daren Brown, major league baseball coach in the Seattle Mariners organization
 Ferd Burket, former CFL player
 Randall Burks, former NFL player
 Michael Burrage, US District Court Judge
 Brett Butler, former major league baseball player
 Ira Clarence Eaker, Lt General US Army, US Army Air Force
 Johnnie Crutchfield, American Politician 
 Chuck Easttom, author, computer scientist, and inventor
 Jeff Frye, former MLB player
 Raymond Gary, (1932) Governor of Oklahoma
 Gary Gray, former MLB player
 Jay Paul Gumm, Economic Developer and politician
 Cecil Hankins, former NBA player
 Jim Hess, former college football coach and NFL scout
 Overton James (1956, 1965), former Governor of the Chickasaw Nation 1963-1987
 Greg Legg, former MLB player
 Scott Loucks, former MLB player
 Chelcie Lynn, Comedian
 Manoj Manchu, Telugu Cinema Actor from Andhra Pradesh, India
 Ron May, former Colorado legislator
 Codey McElroy, tight end for the Tampa Bay Buccaneers of the National Football League
 Reba McEntire, country music singer and actress
 Hack Miller, former MLB player
 Kirby Minter, member of the 1950 US FIBA World championship basketball team
 Dennis Parker, college football coach
 Gregory E. Pyle, Former Chief of the Choctaw Nation of Oklahoma
 Dennis Rodman, Hall of Fame basketball player
 Cody Reed, Professional Golfer
 Crystal Robinson, professional basketball player
 Jerry Shipp, captain and leading scorer of the 1964 Gold Medal Olympic men's basketball team
 Pete Spratt, professional mixed martial arts fighter
 Rollie Stiles, former MLB player
 Seoul City Sue, Missionary, Educator, and Propaganda Radio Announcer
 Mick Thompson, American banker and politician
 David W. Whitlock, 15th president of Oklahoma Baptist University

Notable faculty
Phyllis Fife, painter
David W. Whitlock, 15th president of Oklahoma Baptist University
Glen D. Johnson, Jr., Oklahoma Hall of Fame member and President of Southeastern Oklahoma State University 
Sean Burrage, American Politician and President of Southeastern Oklahoma State University
Henry G. Bennett, American Educator and President of Southeastern Oklahoma State University

References

External links
 
 Southeastern Oklahoma State Athletics website

 
Educational institutions established in 1909
Education in Bryan County, Oklahoma
Buildings and structures in Bryan County, Oklahoma
1909 establishments in Oklahoma
Public universities and colleges in Oklahoma